The Sting is a 1992 Hong Kong action comedy film directed by Nico Wong and starring Andy Lau, Rosamund Kwan, Simon Lui and Bowie Lam.

Plot
Simon Tam (Andy Lau) is a righteous private detective who is working for free for 3 years and 8 months at the behest of his superstitious mentor. Simon has completed 3 years, 7 months, and 28 days as the backstory is completed.

On the second to last day of that period, his assistant Joe (Simon Lui) accepts a case involving missing money and an advance down payment of HK$1,000,000. The next day, the client mysteriously dies; Simon decides to find the money for the client's wife, Yvonne (Rosamund Kwan). The missing money turns out to amount to ten thousand million (i.e., ten American billion) Hong Kong dollars of triad money; both Simon and the triads chase after it.

Cast
Andy Lau as Simon Tam
Rosamund Kwan as Yvonne
Simon Lui as Joe
Bowie Lam as Inspector Michael Lee
Chin Ho
Shing Fui-On
Wai Kei-shun
Lo Hung
Pau Fong as Simon's mentor
Henry Fong
Michael Dinga
Mandy Chan as bald killer
Tsang Kan-wing as Tsang
Hon Ping
Leung Biu-ching
Raymond Tsang
Bill Lung as Biu
Tse Wai-kit as triad member
Chun Kwai-po as monk
Chow Kam-kong
Chan Sek
Ng Kwok-kin as policeman
Jacky Cheung Chun-hung
Wong Chi-keung
Choi Kwok-keung as granny assassin
So Wai-nam
Lam Kwok-kit
Leung Kei-hei as thug
Lee Chuen-hau as thug
Lui Siu-ming
Huang Kai-sen

Box office
The film grossed HK$6,660,687 at the Hong Kong box office during its theatrical run from 19 November to 2 December 1992 in Hong Kong.

See also
Andy Lau filmography

External links

The Sting at Hong Kong Cinemagic

1992 films
1992 action comedy films
1992 martial arts films
Hong Kong action comedy films
Hong Kong martial arts films
Hong Kong martial arts comedy films
Hong Kong detective films
Hong Kong slapstick comedy films
1990s Cantonese-language films
Films set in Hong Kong
Films shot in Hong Kong
Triad films
1990s Hong Kong films